The Eloise Copper Mine is a copper mine located  in north west Queensland Australia,  southeast of Cloncurry and  of McKinlay, in the vicinity of Mount Isa.

The deposit was discovered in 1987, the mine has operated since 1996, and was on care and maintenance after 2008. Mining recommenced in early 2011.

In November 2021 AIC Mines acquired the Eloise copper mine from FMR Investments for $27 million.

Transportation 
The mine is nearby the Elrose Airport , named after the Elrose Homestead, and by both the Landsborough Highway and the Flinders Highway.

References

External links 
 Royal Geographical Society of Queensland's article
 Mining Weekly article on the resource estimates (Sep. 2007)

Mines in Queensland
Copper mines in Queensland